The Belchen System refers to five mountains with the name Belchen around the tripoint of Germany, France and Switzerland that may have been used by the Celts as a solar calendar. The term is an extension of the Belchen Triangle.  The mountains are:
 Belchen, or Black Forest Belchen
 Belchenflue, or Swiss Belchen
 Ballon d'Alsace, or Alsatian Belchen
 Grand Ballon, or Great Belchen
 Petit Ballon, or Little Belchen

Geographical description 
The heart of the Belchen System is the southernmost mountain of the Vosges, the Ballon d'Alsace (Elsässer Belchen or Alsatian Belchen, 1,247 metres). Seventy three kilometres due east is the Black Forest Belchen (Schwarzwälder Belchen, 1,414 metres), which is only 167 metres higher and over which the sun rises at the equinoxes, i.e. at the beginning of spring and autumn, as seen from Grand Ballon. Conversely, the sun sets over the Alsatian Belchen on these days when seen from the Black Forest Belchen.

Viewed from the Alsatian Belchen at the time of the summer solstice, the sun rises over Petit Ballon (Kleiner Belchen or Little Belchen, 1,272 metres), 27 kilometres away to the northeast. At the winter solstice it rises over the Belchenflue (Schweizer Belchen or Swiss Belchen, 1,099 metres), 88 kilometres to the southeast. Thus from the Alsatian Belchen the start of all four astronomical seasons is defined.

The region of the Belchen System is known today as the Upper Rhine, the Regio Basiliensis, the Dreiland or RegioTriRhena.

See also
Belchen Tunnel under the Belchenflue

References 
 Walter Eichin, Andreas Bohnert: Belchensystem, in Das Markgräfler Land, 1985, Issue 2, pp. 176ff.
 Astronomisch-kalendarisches Ortungssystem, in Jurablätter, 5 May 1988
 Rolf d’Aujourd’hui: Das Belchensystem, Basler Zeitung, 18 June 1992

External links 
 Rolf d’Aujourd’hui: Belchen, Historic Lexicon of Switzerland, retrieved 20 May 2013
 Karl Rammstein: The Belchen Legend, 13. Juni 2004, retrieved 20 May 2013
 Hannes Hanggi:  Ich will das System verankern (pdf; 844 kB), Basler Zeitung, 8 December 2007, retrieved 20 May 2013
 Gianni Mazzucchelli:  Der Sonnenkalender von Rothenfluh - Das Belchen-System (pdf; 9.5 MB), retrieved 20 May 2013
 Belchen, guajara.com, retrieved 20 May 2013
 regbas.ch: Belchen Triangle explained, with illustration
 Reference at archaeobasel.ch: Projekt Archäo-Geometrie – Belchendreieck (PDF; 160 kB); im Jahresbericht der Archäologischen Bodenforschung des Kantons Basel-Stadt 1993, incl. bibliography
 Das magische Dreieck SRF broadcast from the series: Mysterious Switzerland

Regions of Europe
Upper Rhine
Archaeoastronomy